Chintamani Nagesa Ramachandra Rao BR,   (born 30 June 1934), is an Indian chemist who has worked mainly in solid-state and structural chemistry. He has honorary doctorates from 84 universities from around the world and has authored around 1,774 research publications and 56 books. He is described as a scientist who had won all possible awards in his field except the Nobel Prize.

A precocious child, Rao completed BSc from Mysore University at age seventeen, and MSc from Banaras Hindu University at age nineteen. He earned a PhD from Purdue University at the age of twenty-four. He was the youngest lecturer when he joined the Indian Institute of Science in 1959. After a transfer to Indian Institute of Technology Kanpur, he returned to IISc, eventually becoming its Director from 1984 to 1994. He was chair of the Scientific Advisory Council to the Prime Minister of India from 1985 to 1989 and from 2005 to 2014. He founded and works in Jawaharlal Nehru Centre for Advanced Scientific Research and International Centre for Materials Science.

Rao received most important scientific awards and honours including the Marlow Medal, Shanti Swarup Bhatnagar Prize for Science and Technology, Hughes Medal, India Science Award, Dan David Prize, Royal Medal, Von Hippel Award, and ENI award. He also received Padma Shri and Padma Vibhushan from the Government of India. On 16 November 2013, the Government of India selected him for Bharat Ratna, the highest civilian award in India, making him the third scientist after C.V. Raman and A. P. J. Abdul Kalam to receive the award. He received the award on 4 February 2014 from President Pranab Mukherjee at the Rashtrapati Bhavan.

Early life and education
C.N.R. Rao was born in a Kannada Deshastha Madhva Brahmin  family in Bangalore to Hanumantha Nagesa Rao and Nagamma Nagesa Rao. His father was an Inspector of Schools. He was an only child, and his learned parents made an academic environment. He was well versed in Hindu literature from his mother and in English from his father at an early age. He did not attend elementary school but was home-tutored by his mother, who was particularly skilled in arithmetic and Hindu literature. He entered middle school in 1940, at age six. Although he was the youngest in his class, he used to tutor his classmates in mathematics and English. He passed the lower secondary examination (class VII) in the first class in 1944. He was ten years old, and his father rewarded him with four annas (twenty-five paisa). He attended Acharya Patashala high school in Basavanagudi, which made a lasting influence on his interest in chemistry. His father enrolled him to a Kannada-medium course to encourage his mother tongue, but at home used English for all conversation. He completed secondary school leaving certificate in first class in 1947. He studied BSc at Central College, Bangalore. Here he developed his communication skills in English and also learnt Sanskrit.

He obtained his bachelor's degree from Mysore University in 1951, in first class, and only at the age of seventeen. He initially thought of joining Indian Institute of Science (IISc) for a diploma or a postgraduate degree in chemical engineering, but a teacher persuaded him to attend Banaras Hindu University. He obtained a master's in chemistry from BHU two years later. In 1953 he was granted a scholarship for PhD in Indian Institute of Technology Kharagpur. But four foreign universities, MIT, Penn State, Columbia and Purdue also offered him financial support. He chose Purdue. His first research paper was published in the Agra University Journal of Research in 1954. He completed PhD in 1958, only after two years and nine months, at the age of twenty-four.

Career

After completion of his graduate studies, Rao returned to Bangalore in 1959 to take up a lecturing position, joining IISc and embarking on an independent research program. The facility at the time was so meagre that he described it, saying, "You would get string and sealing wax and that's about it." In 1963 he accepted a permanent position in the Department of Chemistry at the Indian Institute of Technology Kanpur. He was elected Fellow of the Indian Academy of Sciences in 1964. He returned to IISc in 1976 to establish a solid state and structural chemistry unit. and became director of the IISc from 1984 to 1994. At various points in his career Rao has taken appointments as a visiting professor at Purdue University, the University of Oxford, the University of Cambridge and University of California, Santa Barbara. He was the Jawaharlal Nehru Professor at the University of Cambridge and Professorial Fellow at the King's College, Cambridge during 1983–1984.

Rao has been working as the National Research Professor holding the positions Linus Pauling Research Professor and Honorary President of Jawaharlal Nehru Centre for Advanced Scientific Research, Bangalore, which he founded in 1989. He had served as chair of the Scientific Advisory Council to the Indian Prime Minister for two terms, from 1985 to 1989 and from 2005 to 2014. He is also the director of the International Centre for Materials Science (ICMS), which he founded in 2010, and serves on the board of the Science Initiative Group.

Scientific contribution 
Rao is one of the world's foremost solid state and materials chemists. He has contributed to the development of the field over five decades. His work on transition metal oxides has led to basic understanding of novel phenomena and the relationship between materials properties and the structural chemistry of these materials.

Rao was one of the earliest to synthesise two-dimensional oxide materials such as La2CuO4. He was one of the first to synthesise 123 cuprates, the first liquid nitrogen-temperature superconductor in 1987. He was also the first to synthesis Y junction carbon nanotubes in the mid-1990s. His work has led to a systematic study of compositionally controlled metal-insulator transitions. Such studies have had a profound impact in application fields such as colossal magneto resistance and high temperature superconductivity. Oxide semiconductors have unusual promise.  He has made immense contributions to nanomaterials over the last two decades, besides his work on hybrid materials.

He shares co-authorship of more than 1750 research papers and has co-authored or edited more than 54 books.

Awards and recognition

Fellowships and memberships of academic societies
Fellow of the Indian Academy of Sciences (FASc, 1965)
Fellow of the Indian National Science Academy (FNA, 1974)
Fellow of the Royal Society (FRS, 1982)
Founding Fellow of The World Academy of Sciences (FTWAS, 1983)
Honorary Fellow of the Royal Society of Chemistry (Hon. FRSC, 1989) 
Foreign Member of the Academia Europaea (MAE, 1997)
Honorary Fellow of the Institute of Physics (Hon.FInstP, 2007)
Member of many of the world's scientific associations, including the National Academy of Sciences, American Academy of Arts and Sciences, Royal Society of Canada, French Academy, Japanese Academy, Serbian Academy of Sciences and Arts and Polish Academy of Sciences, Czechoslovak Academy of Sciences, Serbian Academy of Sciences, Slovenian Academy of Sciences, Brazilian Academy of Sciences, Spanish Royal Academy of Sciences, National Academy of Sciences of Korea, African Academy of Sciences, and the American Philosophical Society. He is also a member of the Pontifical Academy.

Honorary doctorates 
From several universities, including Bordeaux, Caen, Colorado, Khartoum, Liverpool, Northwestern, Novosibirsk, Oxford, Purdue, Stellenbosch, Universite Joseph Fourier, Wales, Wroclaw, Notre Dame, Uppsala, Aligarh Muslim University, Anna, AP, Banaras, Bengal Engineering, Bangalore, Burdwan, Bundelkhand, Delhi, Hyderabad, IGNOU, IIT Bombay, Kharagpur, Delhi, Patna, JNTU, Kalyani, Karnataka, Kolkata, Kuvempu, Lucknow, Mangalore, Manipur, Mysore, Osmania, Punjab, Roorkee, Sikkim Manipal, SRM, Tumkur, Sri Venkateswara, Vidyasagar, Amity University, Gurgaon, Visveswaraya Technological University and The Assam Royal Global University, Guwahati 2022.

Major scientific awards

 1967: Marlow Medal by the Faraday Society of England
 1968: Shanti Swarup Bhatnagar Prize for Science and Technology in Chemical Science
 2000: Centenary Medal of the Royal Society of Chemistry, London
 2000: Hughes Medal by the Royal Society
 2004: India Science Award
 2005: Dan David Prize from Tel Aviv University shared with George Whitesides and Robert Langer.
 2008: Abdus Salam Medal by The World Academy of Sciences (TWAS)
 2009: Royal Medal by the Royal Society
 2010: August-Wilhelm-von-Hofmann Medal by the German Chemical Society
 2017: The Von Hippel Award by the Materials Research Society
 2021: International ENI award 2020 for research in renewable energy sources and energy storage, also called the Energy Frontier award

Scientific awards

 1961: DSc from Mysore University.
 1973: Yedanapalli Medal and Prize
 1975: C. V. Raman Award in Physical Science by the University Grants Commission of India
 1980: S. N. Bose Medal by the Indian National Science Academy
 1981: Royal Society of Chemistry (London) Medal
 1981: Founding member of the World Cultural Council
 1989: Hevrovsky Gold Medal of the Czechoslovak Academy of Sciences
 1990: Meghnath Saha Medal of the Indian National Science Academy
 1996: Einstein Gold Medal of UNESCO
 2004: Doctor of Science from University of Calcutta.
 2004: Somiya Award of the International Union of Materials Research.
 2008: Nikkei Asia Prize for Science, Technology and Innovation, by Nihon Keizai Shimbun, Inc., Japan.
 2008: Khwarizmi International Award 2008 for Innovation along with Ajayan Vinu
 2011: Ernesto Illy Trieste Science Prize for materials research
 2013: 2012 Award for International Scientific Cooperation from the Chinese Academy of Sciences
 2013: Elected honorary foreign member of Chinese Academy of Sciences
 2013: Distinguished Academician Award from IIT Patna
 2018: Platinum Medal from Indian Association of Nanoscience and Nanotechnology
 2019: The first Sheikh Saud International Prize for Materials Research from the Center for Advanced Materials of the United Arab Emirates
 Foreign fellow of Bangladesh Academy of Sciences

Indian governmental honours
 Padma Shri in 1974
 Padma Vibhushan in 1985
 Karnataka Ratna by the Karnataka State Government in 2000
 Bharat Ratna in 2014

Foreign honours
 Great Cross of the National Order of Scientific Merit from the President of Brazil in 2002
 Chevalier de la Légion d'honneur (Knight of the Legion of Honour, France) in 2005
 Order of Friendship by the President of Russia in 2009
 Order of the Rising Sun (Gold and Silver Star) of Japan in 2015

Legacy 

 Rao with his wife established the CNR Rao Education Foundation using the Dan David Prize money. The foundation is based in Jawaharlal Nehru Centre for Advanced Scientific Research and offers Best Science Teacher Award to pre-university and high school science teachers.
Rao established the International Centre for Materials Science (ICMS) which offers the C N R Rao Prize Lecture in Advanced Materials since 2010.
The World Academy of Sciences instituted the TWAS-C.N.R. Rao Award for Scientific Research since 2006 for scientists in the least developed countries.
The Shanmugha Arts, Science, Technology & Research Academy has created the SASTRA-CNR Rao Award for Chemistry and Material Science in 2014.

Personal life
Rao is married to Indumati Rao in 1960. They have two children, Sanjay and Suchitra. Sanjay works as a science populariser in schools around Bangalore. Suchitra is married to Krishna N. Ganesh, the Director of the Indian Institute of Science Education and Research (IISER) at Pune, Maharashtra. Rao is technophobic and he never checks his email by himself. He also said that he uses the mobile phone only to talk to his wife.

Controversies

In 1987, Rao and his team published a series of four papers, of which three were in the Proceedings of the Indian Academy of Sciences (Chemical Science), Pramana, and Current Science, all published by the Indian Academy of Sciences. A report was submitted to the Society for Scientific Values that the three papers had no mention of the dates of receipt, which were normally explicitly mentioned in those journals. Upon inquiry, it was found that the paper manuscripts were actually received after the date of publication, indicating that they were backdated. The society declared the case as "Use of Wrong Means to Claim Priority."

Rao has been subject of allegations on plagiarism. Rao and Saluru Baba Krupanidhi at the Indian Institute of Science in Bangalore, with their students Basant Chitara and L. S. Panchakarla, published a paper "Infrared photodetectors based on reduced graphene oxide and graphene nanoribbons" in the journal Advanced Materials in 2011. After publication the journal editors found sentences copied verbatim in the introduction and methodology from a paper published in Applied Physics Letters in 2010. According to Nature report, it was Basant Chitara, a PhD student at IISc, who wrote the text. An apology was issued by the authors later in the same journal. Rao said that he did read the manuscript and that it was an oversight on his part as he focused mainly on the results and discussion.

Scientists such as Rahul Siddharthan (Institute of Mathematical Sciences, Chennai), Y.B. Srinivas (Institute of Wood Science and Technology), and D.P. Sengupta (former professor at IISC), agreed that the plagiarised portion has no bearing on the findings, yet Siddharthan opined that the reactions made by Rao and Krupanidhi were overboard. Rao and Krupanidhi publicly blamed Chitara, and denied the publication as not plagiarism. Rao had commented, "This should not be really considered as plagiarism, but an instance of copying of a few sentences in the text." He even extended the blame to Krupanidhi asserting that he had no role in it as it was written by Krupanidhi without his knowledge. His claims were not justified by the fact that he was the senior scientist and corresponding author in that publication.

More allegations of instances of plagiarism in articles co-authored Rao have been reported. Written with S. Venkataprasad Bhat and Krupanidhi, Rao's paper in 2010 about the effect of nanoparticles on solar cells in Applied Physics Express contains texts that are very similar to those of a paper by Matheu et al. from Applied Physics Letters in 2008, which it did not even cite. Rao had stated, referring to the 2011 incident, that "[If] I have ever stolen an idea or a result (in) my entire life, (then) hang me." But Rao's article contains similar study to and duplicated figures with that of Matheu et al. An article in the Journal of Luminescence in 2011, written with Chitara, Nidhi Lal and Krupanidhi, contains 20 unattributed lines which appear to be copied from articles by Itskos et al. in Nanotechnology (June 2009 issue) and Heliotis et al. in Advanced Materials (January 2006 issue). Another article in Nanotechnology, written also with Chitara and Krupanidhi, uses six lines from the 1995 article by Huang et al. in Applied Physics Letters.

Rao was given a Bharat Ratna by the Government of India in spite of the controversy and was active as a professor at Jawaharlal Nehru Centre for Advanced Scientific Research (JNCASR). In December 2013, brother and sister Tanaya Thakur, a law student, and Aditya Thakur, a class XII student, filed a public interest litigation in Allahabad High Court, Lucknow Bench, to challenge Rao's Bharat Ratna. They asserted that "a scientist with proven cases of plagiarism shall not be presented the highest civilian award." But the court ruled them out as "filing pleas for publicity." There was another plea to revoke the award in 2015, but the Central Information Commission dismissed the petition.

On 17 November 2013, at a press conference following the announcement of his Bharat Ratna, he called the Indian politicians "idiots" which caused a national outrage. He said, "Why the hell have these idiots [politicians] given so little to us despite what we have done? For the money that the government has given us we [scientists] have done much more." In his defence Rao insisted that he merely talked about the "idiotic" way the politicians ignore investments for research funding in science.

References

Further reading
 C.N.R. Rao (2010). [ Climbing the Limitless Ladder: A Life in Chemistry]. World Scientific Publishing Co. Pte. Ltd., Singapore.

External links

 Academic profile at the Pontifical Academy of Sciences
 Dan David Prize laureate 2005
 Prof. CNR Rao @ JNCASR
 Jawaharlal Nehru Centre for Advanced Scientific Research
 C.N.R. Rao Hall of Science
 Solid State and Structural Chemistry Unit

1934 births
Living people
Recipients of the Karnataka Ratna
Banaras Hindu University alumni
Foreign associates of the National Academy of Sciences
Members of the Serbian Academy of Sciences and Arts
Foreign Members of the USSR Academy of Sciences
Foreign Members of the Russian Academy of Sciences
Fellows of the Royal Society
Fellows of the Royal Society of Canada
Fellows of Bangladesh Academy of Sciences
Fellows of the Indian National Science Academy
Founding members of the World Cultural Council
Members of the Pontifical Academy of Sciences
Foreign members of the Chinese Academy of Sciences
Scientists from Bangalore
Indian institute directors
Kannada people
Purdue University alumni
Academic staff of the Indian Institute of Science
University of Mysore alumni
Recipients of the Great Cross of the National Order of Scientific Merit (Brazil)
Chevaliers of the Légion d'honneur
Recipients of the Bharat Ratna
Recipients of the Padma Vibhushan in science & engineering
Recipients of the Padma Shri in science & engineering
Academic staff of IIT Kanpur
20th-century Indian chemists
Fellows of the Australian Academy of Science
Winners of the Nikkei Asia Prize
Members of the American Philosophical Society
Solid state chemists
Fellows of the African Academy of Sciences
Associate Fellows of the African Academy of Sciences
Foreign members of the Serbian Academy of Sciences and Arts